Otevo is a rural locality (a selo) in Beloyevskoye Rural Settlement, Kudymkarsky District, Perm Krai, Russia. The population was 112 as of 2010. There are 6 streets.

Geography 
Otevo is located 10 km northwest of Kudymkar (the district's administrative centre) by road. Zapolye is the nearest rural locality.

References 

Rural localities in Kudymkarsky District